Stone Horizons (Kameni horizonti) is a 1953 Croatian film directed by Šime Šimatović.

External links
 

1953 films
1950s Croatian-language films
Yugoslav drama films
Jadran Film films
Films set in 1940
Croatian black-and-white films
Yugoslav black-and-white films
1953 directorial debut films